Žablje is a small settlement in the hills north of Kranj in the Upper Carniola region of Slovenia.

References

External links

Žablje on Geopedia

Populated places in the City Municipality of Kranj